Highway H01 is a Ukrainian national highway (H-highway) connecting the capital of Ukraine Kyiv with the central regions. It runs through Kyiv, Kyiv Oblast, Cherkasy Oblast, and ends in Kirovohrad Oblast.

Main route

Main route and connections to/intersections with other highways in Ukraine.

Pedestrian traffic 

In 2020, a pedestrian bridge over the highway H01 was built in Obukhiv (Kyiv Oblast).

See also

 Roads in Ukraine
 Ukraine Highways
 International E-road network
 Pan-European corridors

References

External links
 National Roads in Ukraine in Russian
 European Roads in Russian

Roads in Kyiv
Roads in Kyiv Oblast
Roads in Cherkasy Oblast
Roads in Kirovohrad Oblast